The Erfurt Enchiridion (enchiridion, from , hand book) is the second Lutheran hymnal. It appeared in 1524 in Erfurt in two competing editions. One of them contains 26 songs, the other 25, 18 of them by Martin Luther, others by Elisabeth Cruciger, Erhard Hegenwald, Justus Jonas and Paul Speratus. While the songs of the Enchiridion could be used in churches, they were intended primarily for singing elsewhere, such as at home, at court, and in guild meetings.

History 

The songs of the reformer Luther and others were first sold as broadsheets, and contributed to the spreading of Protestant ideas. The Erfurt Enchiridion appeared the same year, in two almost equal editions by two different printers, Johannes Loersfeld and Matthes Maler. Both books are identical except for one song. The double appearance suggests that there was a great demand. Probably the edition printed by Loersfeld came first, to be copied by Maler.

Description 
The version of Loersfeld was printed in octavo, and includes 48 pages, 47 of them printed. It contains 25 songs, the German version of the creed and a two-page anonymous preface. The version of Maler contains one song more. Sixteen different choral melodies are used, and eighteen of the songs are by Luther, but his name is attached to only one of them. Three of the hymns were written by Paul Speratus, one or two by Justus Jonas, one by Elisabeth Cruciger, and one is attributed to Jan Hus. The arrangement of the songs is not systematic, and only seven paraphrases of psalms form a cohesive group. Five songs are German rhymed versions of Latin liturgical chants. The song "" (A new song we begin) describes the execution in Brussels of two monks who were martyrs of the Reformation, Hendrik Vos and Johannes van Esschen.

The title describes: "Eyn Enchiridion oder Handbüchlein. eynem ytzlichen Christen fast nutzlich bey sich zuhaben / zur stetter vbung vnd trachtung geystlicher gesenge vnd Psalmen / Rechtschaffen vnd kunstlich verteutscht." (An Enchiridion or little handbook; for every Christian very useful to keep at hand / for continuous practice and contemplation of spiritual songs and psalms / honestly and artfully translated to German.)

The author of the preface describes the former ecclesiastical chant as "shouting like the priests of Baal in unintelligable cries" and "cry like the forest-donkeys to a deaf God". The songs included in the collection are described as founded on scripture, serving improvement, doctrine, and the education of youth, and the preface suggests that a Christian should always carry the book with him, for constant practise. While the songs of the Enchiridion could be used in churches, they were intended primarily for singing elsewhere, such as at home, at court, and in guild meetings.

Many of the songs of the Erfurt Enchiridion were widely disseminated, and seventeen are still in the current German Protestant hymnal , some of them now with different melodies. Five of the hymns are part of the Catholic hymnal Gotteslob.

Translations began with Goostly psalms and spiritual songes drawen out of the holy Scripture by Myles Coverdale, the so-called "first English hymn book", which was printed in London in 1555 and contained 16 of the songs from the Enchiridion (1–5, 8, 10, 12–19, 22).

Hymns

See also 

 Metrical psalter

Lutheran
 First Lutheran hymnal
 Eyn geystlich Gesangk Buchleyn
 Swenske songer eller wisor 1536
 Thomissøn's hymnal

Anabaptist
 Ausbund

Anglican
Book of Common Prayer
Whole Book of Psalms

Presbyterian
Book of Common Order
Scottish Psalter

Reformed
Souterliedekens
Genevan Psalter

References

Bibliography 

  Full digital facsimile and diplomatic transcription of the hymnbook in the Deutsches Text Archiv
 
 
 
 
Henrike Lähnemann (2017): Das Erfurter ‘Enchiridion’ in der Goslarer Marktkirchen-Bibliothek, in: Marktkirchen-Bibliothek Goslar. Beiträge zur Erforschung der reformationszeitlichen Sammlung, Regensburg: Schell und Steiner, ed. Helmut Liersch, pp. 232–243.

Further reading
 
 
 

1524 books
16th-century Christian texts
Lutheran hymnals
Reformation in Germany